The Men's High Jump athletics events for the 2012 Summer Paralympics took place at the London Olympic Stadium on 3 September  and 8 September. A total of 2 events were contested for 2 different classifications.

Results

F42

F46
Competition took place on 8 September.

References

Athletics at the 2012 Summer Paralympics
2012 in men's athletics